Samson K. Aiona (born August 19, 1965) is a businessman and politician in Hawaii who served as a state representative from 1996 to 1998, He also served as a party leader and leading a government social service agency.

He was born in Hilo. He was a candidate to unseat Democrat Jim Shon and was supported by Patricia Saiki and Franklin Kometani. He served as chair of Hawaii's Republican Party.

References

Republican Party members of the Hawaii House of Representatives
1965 births
Living people
Asian conservatism in the United States